The 1969/70 NTFL season was the 49th season of the Northern Territory Football League (NTFL).

Darwin have won their 17th premiership title while defeating St Marys in the grand final by 13 points.

Grand Final

References 

Northern Territory Football League seasons
NTFL